Quinn Gleason and Ingrid Neel were the defending champions but Gleason chose not to participate. Neel partnered alongside Alycia Parks but lost in the first round to Irina Bara and Lucrezia Stefanini.

Sophie Chang and Angela Kulikov won the title, defeating Bara and Stefanini in the final, 6–4, 3–6, [10–8].

Seeds

Draw

Draw

References
Main Draw

U.S. Pro Women's Clay Court Championships - Doubles